Neil Turner (born 16 September 1945) is a Labour Party politician in the United Kingdom and former Member of Parliament (MP) for Wigan. He was elected in a 1999 by-election and stood down at the 2010 general election.

Early life
Turner went to Carlisle Grammar School, which became the Trinity School in 1968. He was a quantity surveyor for Fairclough Builders, which became AMEC, from 1967–94, then was Operations Director for North Shropshire District Council from 1995–7.

Parliamentary career
He represented the North West Region on the National Committee of the Labour Party Young Socialists in 1970, following Roger Stott. He contested the seat of Oswestry in 1970. He was the Parliamentary Private Secretary to Ian McCartney as: Minister of State, Department for Work and Pensions 2001–3, Minister without Portfolio and Party Chair 2003–06 and Secretary of State for Trade and Industry 2006–.

When a dyslexic constituent, Stephen Halsall (a psychiatric nurse), sent him a letter in March 2001 complaining about a drug rehabilitation unit being built near to him, Turner returned the letter to the constituent with all the spelling and grammatical errors underlined and annotated in red ink, e,g we only have 1 Labour Party – should be Party's.

On 31 July 2009, Turner announced his decision to stand down at the 2010 general election.

Personal life
Turner married Susan Price on 26 March 1971 in Wigan and has one son. He follows Wigan Warriors.

References

External links
 Guardian Unlimited Politics – Ask Aristotle: Neil Turner MP
 TheyWorkForYou.com – Neil Turner MP
 BBC Politics
 

1945 births
Living people
Labour Party (UK) MPs for English constituencies
UK MPs 1997–2001
UK MPs 2001–2005
UK MPs 2005–2010
People educated at Carlisle Grammar School
Politicians from Carlisle, Cumbria
Quantity surveyors
Members of the Parliament of the United Kingdom for Wigan